Phillip Reed (born Milton LeRoy; March 25, 1908 – December 7, 1996) was an American actor. He played Steve Wilson in a series of four films (1947–1948) based on the Big Town radio series.

Early years
Reed was a star athlete at Erasmus Hall High School in Brooklyn and attended college for one year before going into acting. His name was changed after he went to Hollywood.

Acting career
Billed as Milton Leroy, Reed appeared in two Broadway plays: Melody and Ballyhoo of 1932.

Reed played Russ Barrington in the soap opera Society Girl on CBS radio and Brian Wells in the soap opera David Harum, also on CBS.

Reed's television appearances include a lead role in the 1955 anthology drama  series Police Call. He appeared in the Alfred Hitchcock Presents episodes "The Derelicts,” "A Bullet for Baldwin" and “Sylvia.” He also appeared as King Toranshah in the 1965 Elvis Presley musical film Harum Scarum.

Death
Reed died in 1996 and was buried at Forest Lawn Memorial Park Cemetery in Glendale, California.

Complete filmography

College Coach (1933) - 'Wes' Westerman
Female (1933) - Freddie Claybourne
The House on 56th Street (1933) - Freddy
Fashions of 1934 (1934) - Jimmy
Gambling Lady (1934) - Steve
Jimmy the Gent (1934) - Ronny Gatson
Journal of a Crime (1934) - Young Man at Party
Registered Nurse (1934) - Bill
Glamour (1934) - Lorenzo Valenti
Affairs of a Gentleman (1934) - Carter Vaughn
Dr. Monica (1934) - 'Bunny' Burton
British Agent (1934) - Gaston LeFarge
A Lost Lady (1934) - Ned
Big Hearted Herbert (1934) - Andrew Goodrich
Maybe It's Love (1935) - Adolph Jr.
The Woman in Red (1935) - Dan McCall
Sweet Music (1935) - Grant
Gypsy Sweetheart (1935, Short) - Tom Van Dyke
The Case of the Curious Bride (1935) - Dr. Millbeck
The Girl from 10th Avenue (1935) - Tony Hewlett
Accent on Youth (1935) - Dickie Reynolds
The Murder of Dr. Harrigan (1936) - Dr. Simon
Klondike Annie (1936) - Insp. Jack Forrest
The Last of the Mohicans (1936) - Uncas
The Luckiest Girl in the World (1936) - Percy Mayhew
Madame X (1937) - Jean
Merrily We Live (1938) - Herbert Wheeler
My Irish Molly (1938) - Bob
Aloma of the South Seas (1941) - Revo
Weekend for Three (1941) - Randy Bloodworth
A Gentleman After Dark (1942) - Eddie Smith
Old Acquaintance (1943) - Lucian Grant
People Are Funny (1946) - John Guedel
Hot Cargo (1946) - Chris Bigelow
Rendezvous with Annie (1946) - Lt. Avery
Big Town (1946) - Steve Wilson
Her Sister's Secret (1946) - Richard 'Dick' Connolly
Song of Scheherazade (1947) - Prince Mischetsky
I Cover Big Town (1947) - Steve Wilson
Song of the Thin Man (1947) - Tommy Edlon Drake
Pirates of Monterey (1947) - Lt. Carlos Ortega
Big Town After Dark (1947) - Steve Wilson
Big Town Scandal (1948) - Steve Wilson
Bodyguard (1948) - Freddie Dysen
Unknown Island (1948) - Ted Osborne
Daughter of the West (1949) - Navo White Eagle
Manhandled (1949) - Guy Bayard
Davy Crockett, Indian Scout (1950) - Red Hawk
Tripoli (1950) - Hamet Karamanly
The Bandit Queen (1950) - Joaquin Murietta
Thief in Silk (1953)
Jeunes mariés (1953)
Take Me to Town (1953) - Newton Cole
The Girl in the Red Velvet Swing (1955) - Robert Collier
The Tattered Dress (1957) - Michael Reston
Harum Scarum (1965) - King Toranshah (final film role)

References

External links

 
 
 

1908 births
1996 deaths
American male film actors
American male radio actors
American male television actors
20th-century American male actors
Male actors from New York City
Burials at Forest Lawn Memorial Park (Glendale)
Erasmus Hall High School alumni